The Syracuse, Geneva and Corning Railway was established in 1875 and opened their road on December 10, 1877. The company was leased to and operated by the Fall Brook Coal Company for 20 years beginning in 1881. 

On October 1, 1885, the company consolidated without a change of name with the Penn Yan and New York Railroad Company, which was leased to the New York Central and Hudson River Railroad Company in 1899. In 1909, the company merged with Geneva, Corning and Southern Railroad and once again in 1914, into New York Central Railroad (NYCRR).

References

Predecessors of the New York Central Railroad
Defunct railroads in Syracuse, New York
Defunct New York (state) railroads
Railway companies established in 1875
Railway companies disestablished in 1909